Shanghai is a city in China.

Shanghai may also refer to:

Places

China
 Shanghai Subdistrict, a subdistrict of Fuzhou, Fujian
 Shanghai County, a former county, fully absorbed by Minhang District, Shanghai in 1992
 Shanghai International Settlement, China (1842 to 1943)

United States
 Shanghai City, Illinois, an unincorporated community
 Shanghai, Virginia, an unincorporated community
 Shanghai, West Virginia, an unincorporated community
 Shanghai Lake, Le Sueur County, Minnesota

Entertainment

In film
 Shanghai (1935 film), starring Loretta Young
 Shanghai (2010 film), starring John Cusack and Gong Li
 Shanghai (2012 film), an Indian film directed by Dibakar Banerjee and starring Abhay Deol and Emraan Hashmi

Games
 Shanghai (video game), a computerized version of mahjong solitaire published in 1986
 Shanghai Rum, a card game based on gin rummy
 Shanghai, the combination 20, double 20 and treble 20 (scoring a total of 120), in darts
 Shanghai Solitaire, an alternative name for mahjong solitaire

Music
 "Shanghai" (song), a 1951 song by Doris Day
 "Shanghai", a song off the deluxe version of The Pink Print by Nicki Minaj
 Shanghai Nobody, a stage name of Siobhán Emma Donaghy (born 1984), Irish-English singer-songwriter

Transportation
 Shanghai Y-10, a cancelled commercial passenger jet
 Shanghai Automotive Industry Corporation, a former name of SAIC Motor

People
 James Kelly (crimper), better known as "Shanghai" Kelly, an American crimp who kidnapped men for ships' crews
 Abel Head "Shanghai" Pierce (1834–1900), Texas rancher

Other uses
 Shanghai (photograph), a 2000 photograph by Andreas Gursky
 Shanghai (processor), an AMD 45nm computer processor of the AMD_K10 family
 2197 Shanghai, an asteroid named after the city
 Shanghai Cooperation Organisation, an intergovernmental security organization
 Shanghaiing, the practice of conscripting men as sailors by coercive techniques
 Lumpiang shanghai, a variety of lumpia pastries
 Shanghai, an alternative name for the slingshot

See also

Lists of people by nickname